Kyma (κύμα) is a Greek word meaning wave, and may refer to:

Kyma (sound design language), a software environment for specifying and manipulating audio signals
KYMA-DT, the call letters of a television station in Yuma, Arizona USA
KYMA-DT (1988–2020)
Kyma (automobile), an English automobile
Kyma (river), a river in Northern Russia